Le Petit Sénégal, or Little Senegal, is a neighborhood in the New York City borough of Manhattan. It has been called Le Petit Senegal by the West African immigrant community and Little Senegal by some people from outside the neighborhood.

Le Petit Senegal is a smaller section of the much larger, and older, neighborhood of Harlem. The neighborhood's exact borders are difficult to define as it is still new, growing from nonexistent in 1985 to 6,500 by 2005. Le Petit Senegal is generally defined as located in Central Harlem. The neighborhood's main streets are the blocks surrounding West 116th Street between Lenox Avenue / Malcolm X Boulevard on the east and Frederick Douglass Boulevard to the west.

Le Petit Senegal is the main shopping and social area for many of Harlem's West African immigrants. The majority of these recent immigrants hail from French-speaking Senegal, reflecting the French local name of Little Senegal. However, West African languages, such as Wolof, are also spoken. There are also immigrants from other West African countries, including Côte d'Ivoire, Guinea, Mali, Gambia, and Burkina Faso. 

West African shops, restaurants, bistros, bakeries, cafes, and other proprietorships can be found in the neighborhood.

References

Further reading
New York Times: A One-Woman Welcome Wagon in Le Petit Sénégal
Boston Globe (taken from the New York Times): In Dense Stews From Senegal, Intriguing Secrets
 World Cup fans cheer on Senegal at Africa Kine restaurant
An unexpected taste of Vietnam in Harlem's Little West Africa

African culture in New York (state)
Burkinabé American
Ethnic enclaves in New York (state)
Gambian-American history
Ghanaian-American history
Guinean American
Harlem
Ivorian American
Malian American
Neighborhoods in Manhattan
Senegalese-American history